Tanjung Langsat Port (TLP) is a port in Pasir Gudang, Johor Bahru District, Johor, Malaysia. Wholly owned by Johor Corporation, the port handles bulk cargo such as liquefied petroleum gas (LPG) and dangerous chemicals.

History
Initiated in 1995 and commencing partial operation in 2003, it is the third port in the state after Port of Tanjung Pelepas and Johor Port.

Architecture
The port is situated 12 nautical miles (22 km) from the international shipping lane. It has 3.09 km2 (763 acres) of land within the port area and a 4.5 km shoreline facing the Straits of Johor. The port has 5 jetties and 2 cargo wharfs.

Facilities and services
When completed in 2012, Tanjung Langsat Port facilities will include:
 Marine support base;
 Deep sea fishing terminal/multi-purpose wharves;
 Liquid cargo terminal.

The main activities of the port are:
 Petrochemicals and liquid bulk handling;
 Marine support base;
 Deep-sea fishing and multipurpose/barter trade terminal; 
 Processing and storage of petroleum based and liquid bulk cargo; 
 International cruise center.

Petrochemical industries will account for 60% of the activities at the complex, with gas production, steel-making, and marine and marine-related industries making up the remaining 40%. Several chemical companies operating in the Pasir Gudang industrial area have opened new manufacturing facilities at TLP due to space constraints in Pasir Gudang.

TLP is targeting petroleum-based liquid bulk cargo from the industrial area around Pasir Gudang as well as the adjacent "Tanjung Langsat Industrial Estate" developed for petrochemical facilities. The 18.87 square kilometre industrial estate was developed by Johor Corporation, especially for heavy industries, including petroleum and gas. Johor Corporation, the investment arm of the Johor state government, holds 95% equity interest in the company, while the remaining 5% is held by its wholly owned subsidiary, TPM Technopark Sdn. Bhd.

Competition
TLP is expected to face stiff competition from existing integrated petrochemical complexes in Pahang and Terengganu, as well as overseas, namely the Banyan Logistics Hub on Singapore's Jurong Island, and the Majisan Port, off the coast of the Shanghai Chemical Industry Park (SCIP) at Caojing, China. All are vying to become the Asian chemical logistics hub. Currently, large chemical carriers usually transfer cargo to smaller ships at Singapore or Ulsan, South Korea. However, TLP's deepwater facility will lend itself a comparative advantage.

Because of its proximity, TLP is a competitor of the Port of Singapore where complaints over high cost have been rather persistent. Already, Trafigura Pte. Ltd., a Swiss-based oil trading company, has planned to shift the bulk of its petroleum storage operations from Singapore to TLP, once the construction of the petroleum storage facilities is completed in 2008. According to Ichiro Tokuhashi, its managing director, operating at TLP would be 60% cheaper.

References

External links
 Official Homepage of Tanjung Langsat Port
 
 https://archive.today/20040816084107/http://www.tlp.com.my/articleview.php?id=18

2003 establishments in Malaysia
Pasir Gudang
Ports and harbours of Johor